Margaret Lilian Hunt (born 25 April 1942) is a South African former professional tennis player

Active in the 1960s, Hunt reached women's doubles semi-finals at both the French Championships and Wimbledon. In the 1963 Federation Cup, the tournament's inaugural edition, Hunt was a member of the South African team with Renée Schuurman. She won each of her singles and doubles rubbers in the first two ties, against Czechoslovakia and France, to set up a semi-final versus Australia. Schuurman lost the opening rubber, but Hunt looked like levelling the tie when she led Jan Lehane by a set and 5–0, before the Australian came back to won, eliminating the South Africans.

Hunt, who comes from Pretoria, was married to the late Johann Barnard, who headed the SA Tennis Union.

She was the daughter of Eric Pfeilitzer Hunt (1911-2007) and Margaret Evelyn Colenbrander (1916-1999).

See also
List of South Africa Fed Cup team representatives

References

External links
 
 

1942 births
Living people
South African female tennis players
Sportspeople from Pretoria
20th-century South African women
21st-century South African women